Guillaume Rouger (born October 21, 1975) is a retired professional footballer. He played as a striker.

See also
Football in France
List of football clubs in France

References

External links
Guillaume Rouger profile at chamoisfc79.fr

1975 births
Living people
French footballers
Association football forwards
Chamois Niortais F.C. players
Ligue 2 players
SO Châtellerault players